The Instructor was an official periodical of the Church of Jesus Christ of Latter-day Saints (LDS Church) between 1930 and 1970, during which time it was the official organ of the LDS Church's Sunday School organization.

History
The Instructor began publication in 1930, when the church's Sunday School ceased publication of The Juvenile Instructor, its official publication since 1901. Like its predecessor, The Instructor was targeted primarily at the LDS Church's youth and young adult membership. The first editor of the periodical was George D. Pyper, a member of the general superintendency of the Deseret Sunday School Union.

With the implementation of the Priesthood Correlation Program, The Instructor ceased publication in 1970. Although the Sunday School did not replace it with an official publication, in 1971 the LDS Church began publishing the New Era for youth and the Ensign for adults.

See also

 List of Latter Day Saint periodicals

References

External links
 The Instructor (PDF scans) courtesy of the Church History Library and the Internet Archive.

20th-century Mormonism
1930 in Christianity
1930 establishments in Utah
1970 disestablishments in Utah
Monthly magazines published in the United States
The Church of Jesus Christ of Latter-day Saints periodicals
Defunct magazines published in the United States
Magazines disestablished in 1970
Magazines established in 1930
Magazines published in Utah
Mass media in Salt Lake City
Sunday School (LDS Church)
Young people and the Church of Jesus Christ of Latter-day Saints